Martin Fink may refer to one of the following persons:

 Martin Fink, a German politician
 Martin Fink, Chief Technology Officer of Western Digital
 Martin Fink, producer of the film Stunt Rock